Mercitalia (also known as Mercitalia Rail) is a wholly owned subsidiary of the Italian state railway  (FSI) system that operates freight transport and logistics services both within Italy and across Europe.
Mercitalia was founded in January 2016, when the freight operations of Trenitalia were merged with supporting services into the Mercitalia brand, including Rail, Logistics, and Terminals. The following month, FSI announced further details of the company, which in addition to the Mercitalia branded services controls European rail operator TX Logistik, intermodal operator Cemat, Terminal AlpTransit, and TLF. FSI officials said that Mercitalia would expand state-owned freight operations from the primarily domestic Trenitalia Cargo to cross-border European service, with the intent of doubling freight revenue within ten years and more than tripling rail's share of the Italian freight market within fifteen.

FSI planned to invest about €1.5 billion into Mercitalia in its first decade of operation, primarily in locomotives and rolling stock for Mercitalia Rail.  As part of the capital expenditures, Mercitalia in November 2017 ordered up to 125 Bombardier TRAXX electric locomotives at a cost of €400 million, and 50 intermodal and 200 steel freight cars, from Tatravagonka Poprad and Greenbrier respectively, worth €27 million.  The new locomotives entered service for both Mercitalia Rail and TX Logistik and it commenced on November 7, 2018.

Fleet 

Electrical locomotives:

 E.655
 E.656
 E.632
 E.633
 E.652
 E.405
 E.412
 E.483
 E.193
 E.494

Diesel locomotives:

 D.345
 D.445

Shunting locomotives:

 245
 D.145
 214

References

Logistics companies of Italy
Ferrovie dello Stato Italiane
Railway companies established in 2017
Railway companies of Italy